MWC may refer to:

 Mark Williams Company, a software company
 Married... with Children, a U.S. television situation comedy
 Ma Wan Channel, a channel between Ma Wan and Tsing Yi islands in Hong Kong
 Mennonite World Conference, a global community of Christian churches
 Midwest Conference, a U.S. college athletic conference
 The Minnesota Wrecking Crew, a Canadian sketch comedy troupe
 Mobile World Congress, annual conference and trade show for the mobile phone industry in Barcelona
 Monod-Wyman-Changeux model, biochemical model of protein transitions
 Mountain West Conference, another U.S. collegiate athletic conference (more often abbreviated as MW)
 Multiply-with-carry pseudorandom number generator, an algorithm
 Music World Corporation, a U.S. music publishing company
 Oklahoma Marginal Wells Commission
 , a measure of an earthquake's magnitude